Dolga Poljana is a village in the Vipava Valley east of Ajdovščina in the traditional Inner Carniola region of Slovenia. It is now generally regarded as part of the Slovenian Littoral.

Stone arch bridge

A stone arch bridge over the Vipava River links Dolga Poljana to the village of Dolenje. The three-arch bridge was built in the 19th century. It is paved with gravel and is supported by buttresses that are reinforced with groynes on the upstream side. There is a low stone wall on both sides of the bridge, and a shrine with a semi-circular niche once stood at it.

References

External links 
 Dolga Poljana at Geopedia

Populated places in the Municipality of Ajdovščina